The Golden Link is a 1954 British police drama film directed by Charles Saunders, starring André Morell, Patrick Holt, Thea Gregory and Jack Watling. It was produced by Guido Coen under his Kenilworth Film Productions, featuring a screenplay by Allan MacKinnon and soundtrack by Eric Spear. The story concerns the death of a young woman, having fallen to her demise inside an apartment building. A policeman neighbour, Superintendent Blake, conducts an unofficial investigation, which initially seems to implicate his own daughter in a murder plot.

Filmed at Riverside Film Studios in London, the picture was one of several second feature thrillers made in partnership by Saunders and Coen. Restricted by a meagre budget and minor distributors in Archway, production of The Golden Link still stood out for its rich cast and cinematography by Harry Waxman.

The film was generally well received after its release on 24 August 1954. Contemporary reviews broadly characterised it as an interesting and suspenseful whodunit, in spite of the absence of international cast members. More modern assessments have been equally critical regarding a perceived lack of action, although this too has been matched by recent reviews' approval of the plot, particularly toward its beginning.

Plot
In London, a young woman plummets four floors to her death into the hallway of an apartment building also occupied by Superintendent Blake, a police officer. Initially deemed a suicide, Blake suspects foul play but soon finds himself removed from the case. Notwithstanding, he calmly continues to investigate in an unofficial capacity, searching for clues and interviewing persons of interest. Blake eventually narrows his search to two suspects: the victim's husband, Terry Maguire, and his own daughter, Joan, whom happens to be in love with the former. Learning that she had tried to convince Maguire of divorcing the victim, he deduces both to have had ample motive and opportunity to commit murder. Despite his suspicions, Blake finally discovers neither to have been responsible for the crime, Joan having been framed by another neighbour, the true killer.

Cast
The film's cast comprises:

 André Morell as Supt. Blake
 Patrick Holt as Terry Maguire
 Thea Gregory as Joan Blake
 Jack Watling as Bill Howard
 Marla Landi as Singer
 Arnold Bell  as Det. Insp. Harris
 Olive Sloane as Mrs Pullman
 Bruce Beeby  as Sgt. Fred Baker
 Alexander Gauge as  Arnold Debenham
 Ellen Pollock as Mme Sonia
 Dorinda Stevens as  Norma Sheridan
 Charlie Drake as Joe
 Edward Lexy as Maj. Grey
 Elsie Wagstaff as Mrs West

Production
 
The Golden Link was produced by Guido Coen, who under his Kenilworth Film Productions made "about a dozen" second feature thrillers with Charles Saunders between 1954 and 1961. Of these pictures, typically made on a £13,000 budget, Coen stated "style was of secondary consideration", viewing them solely as a means to make a living. While Coen and Saunders made some of these films for major distributors, including Rank, Pathé and Columbia, The Golden Link was instead acquired by a minor company, Archway.

Contrary to its unremarkable financing and distribution, The Golden Link nonetheless harboured "co-feature aspirations" as a consequence of its popular cast (especially Morell, Holt and the debuting Landi), the cinematography of Harry Waxman, as well as through filming at Riverside Film Studios in Hammersmith, London. Wilfred Arnold designed the set at Riverside as the film's art director, accompanying a script by Allan MacKinnon, his first of three under Saunders, and music by Eric Spear; the picture was edited by Jack Slade.

Critical response
Contemporary reviews of The Golden Link were generally favourable. The critic F. Maurice Speed, published in Film Review, commended the picture as an "excellent, modest British whodunit", a view shared in-part by Punch, which while deeming it "a quite ordinary whodunit", nevertheless argued that "there are points about it that make it more interesting to discuss than many a much better and more unusual film". Moderate praise was similarly awarded by Variety, which labelled the film as a "neatly contrived whodunit with sufficient suspense to hold interest", highlighting Saunders' direction in particular. The reviewer nonetheless remained critical regarding the film's lack of foreign talent.

A more recent appraisal by the film historian Steve Chibnall and the film critic Brian McFarlane found The Golden Link, alongside The Hornet's Nest (1955) and Behind the Headlines (1956), to not be "among Saunders' best", "suffer[ing] from an excess of talk and too little action". Conversely, a retrospective review from TV Guide found the film to be a "well-crafted mystery", giving it 3/5 stars. Furthermore, writing for AllMovie, the media historian Hal Erickson notes "a spectacularly violent start" in his assessment of the picture, awarding 2.5/5 stars.

References

Notes

Citations

External links
 
 
 
 

1954 films
1950s crime thriller films
1950s mystery thriller films
1950s police procedural films
British black-and-white films
British detective films
British police films
British thriller films
Adultery in films
Films about divorce
Films about infidelity
Films about murder
Films directed by Charles Saunders
Films set in London
Films shot in London
Films scored by Eric Spear
Films shot at Riverside Studios
1950s English-language films
1950s British films